Candy Creek is a  long 1st order tributary to the Haw River, in Rockingham County, North Carolina.

Variant names
According to the Geographic Names Information System, it has also been known historically as:  
Kanady Creek
Kenadys Branch

Course
Candy Creek rises on the divide between Candy Creek and Reedy Fork about 1 mile east of Monticello, North Carolina in Guilford County.  Candy Creek then flows north-northeast into Rockingham County to meet the Haw River about 5 miles south of Reidsville, North Carolina.

Watershed
Candy Creek drains  of area, receives about 46.2 in/year of precipitation, has a topographic wetness index of 403.48 and is about 29% forested.

Natural History
The Rockingham County Natural Heritage Inventory recognized one location in the Candy Creek watershed, Candy Creek Beaver Pond.  Candy Creek Beaver Pond is of local significance and is part of a larger wetland system.

See also
List of rivers of North Carolina

References

Additional Images

Rivers of North Carolina
Rivers of Guilford County, North Carolina
Rivers of Rockingham County, North Carolina